Bahaa al-Farra (born 10 March 1991) is a Palestinian runner from Gaza. He competed at the 2012 Summer Olympics in the 400 m event, posting a season's best time of 49.93 seconds despite being eliminated in the first round. Along with Woroud Sawalha, he was one of two runners representing Palestine.

References 

1991 births
Living people
Palestinian male sprinters
Olympic athletes of Palestine
Athletes (track and field) at the 2012 Summer Olympics
World Athletics Championships athletes for Palestine